Bellevue East High School is a four-year public secondary school in Bellevue, a suburb south of Omaha, Nebraska. It opened in 1962 as Bellevue High School and was renamed Bellevue East in 1977, following the opening of Bellevue West. It is part of the Bellevue Public School System, with approximately 1,450 students in grades 9 through 12.

Athletics

Bellevue East's marching band won the 2021 NSBA state marching contest.

Performing arts
BEHS has three competitive show choirs. They include the mixed-gender groups "Take II" and "East in Harmony" as well as the all-female "Sensations".

Notable alumni
Jerry DePoyster, Class of 1964: football player
Jim Webb, Class of 1965: United States Senator from Virginia, screenwriter, and author
 Robert Hays, Class of 1965: actor
 Bonnie McElveen-Hunter, Class of 1968: businesswoman and former U.S. Ambassador to Finland
 Rik Bonness, Class of 1972: professional football player
Barclay Knapp, Class of 1975: Senior Fellow at Johns Hopkins University, CEO & Co-Founder of M2M Spectrum Networks 
 Buddy Carlyle, Class of 1996: Major League Baseball player
 Tyler Cloyd, Class of 2005: Major League Baseball player
 Yvonne Turner, Class of 2006: WNBA Basketball player

References

External links
 Bellevue East H.S.

Buildings and structures in Bellevue, Nebraska
Educational institutions established in 1962
1962 establishments in Nebraska
Public high schools in Nebraska
Schools in Sarpy County, Nebraska